This was the first ever Commonwealth tournament held, and Anastasia Rodionova of Australia, the top seed, won the gold medal by defeating India's Sania Mirza in the final. Australia's Sally Peers won the bronze medal.

Medalists

Seeds
The top 4 seeds receive a bye into R2

Main draw

Finals

Top half

Bottom half

References

Tennis at the 2010 Commonwealth Games
2010 in women's tennis